Udunuwara Divisional Secretariat is a  Divisional Secretariat  of Kandy District, of Central Province, Sri Lanka.

The former President of Sri Lanka, Dingiri Banda Wijetunga (1916–2008), entered Parliament for the first time when he successfully contested the Udunuwara electorate at the 1965 general election and remained as the Udnuwara parliament member until he finished his term in parliament.

References

Divisional Secretariats of Kandy District
Geography of Kandy District